Erle may refer to:

Places
 Erle, Astrakhan Oblast, Russia
Erle, California, a former settlement in the United States
Erle (river), a river of Thuringia, Germany
, a borough of the German city of Gelsenkirchen
, a village in the German municipality of Raesfeld

Given name 
Erle Bartley (1922–1983), American agricultural scientist
Erle C. Ellis, American scientist
Erle Elsworth Clippinger (1864–1933), writer of children's literature, educator, and a grammaticist
Erle Cocke Jr. (1921–2000), American businessman
Erle Cox (1873–1950), Australian journalist and science fiction writer
Erle Stanley Gardner (1889–1970), American lawyer and author of detective stories
Erle P. Halliburton (1892–1957), American businessman
Erle Harstad (born 1990), Norwegian figure skater
Erle C. Kenton (1896–1980), American film director
Erle V. Painter (1881–1968), American chiropractor and athletic trainer
Erle Reiter (1916–2008), American figure skater
Erle Whiting (1876–1958), fifth president of The Church of Jesus Christ 
Erle Wiltshire (born 1973), former flyweight boxer from Australia

Surname 
Broadus Erle (1918–1977), American violinist
Christopher Erle (1590–1634), English lawyer and politician
Everett C. Erle (1906–1990), of Oakland, California
Peter Erle (1795–1877), English lawyer
Schuyler Erle, free software developer and activist
Thomas Erle (c. 1680–1720), Lieutenant-General of the Ordnance
Walter Erle (1586–1665), English landowner and politician
Sir William Erle (1793–1880), English lawyer, judge and Whig politician

See also 
 Erl (disambiguation)
 Earle (disambiguation)